Everybody's Hobby is a 1939 American comedy film directed by William C. McGann and written by Kenneth Gamet and William W. Brockway. The film stars Irene Rich, Henry O'Neill, Jackie Moran, Aldrich Bowker, Jean Sharon, John Ridgely and Peggy Stewart. The film was released by Warner Bros. on August 26, 1939.

Plot

Tom Leslie is having some trouble at his newspaper job, so his wife, a stamp collector, suggests he distract himself with a former hobby of his own, photography. Tom takes his son Robert to a national park, where the boy, a short-wave radio enthusiast, enjoys his hobby, too.

A park ranger informs the Leslies that a pyromaniac is on the  loose and to be careful. Soon they and others are threatened by a roaring blaze, but Robert's radio enables them to send for life-saving help, while a photo Tom takes of the fire ends up capturing the pyromaniac in the same frame.

Cast 
 Irene Rich as Mrs. Myra Leslie
 Henry O'Neill as Thomas 'Tom' Leslie
 Jackie Moran as Robert Leslie
 Aldrich Bowker as Uncle Bert Leslie
 Jean Sharon as Evelyn Leslie
 John Ridgely as Ranger Mike Morgan
 Peggy Stewart as Bunny
 Jackie Morrow as Chuck
 Frederic Tozere as Mr. Hatfield 
 Alberto Morin as Ramón Castello
 Nat Carr as Jim Blake
 Sidney Bracey as Mr. Ferris
 Jack Mower as Police Captain Ogden
 Don Rowan as Ranger Murphy

References

External links 
 
 
 
 

1939 films
Warner Bros. films
American comedy films
1939 comedy films
Films directed by William C. McGann
American black-and-white films
1930s English-language films
1930s American films